Falconio is a surname. Notable people with the surname include:

Peter Falconio (1973-2001), British tourist who disappeared in the Australian outback
Diomede Falconio (1842-1917), Italian Roman Catholic cardinal
Placido Falconio (16th century), Italian composer

Italian-language surnames